Sascha Boller (born 16 February 1984) is a German former professional footballer who played as a midfielder.

References

External links
 

1984 births
Living people
German footballers
Association football midfielders
Austrian Football Bundesliga players
2. Bundesliga players
SV Grödig players
TSG 1899 Hoffenheim II players
TSG 1899 Hoffenheim players
SpVgg Greuther Fürth players
SSV Reutlingen 05 players
Eintracht Frankfurt II players
SC Austria Lustenau players
Sportspeople from Pforzheim
Footballers from Baden-Württemberg
21st-century German people